The Whole of the Moon: The Music of Mike Scott and the Waterboys is a compilation album by The Waterboys and Mike Scott, released in 1998 by EMI.

Critical reception

William Ruhlmann of AllMusic described the compilation as an "excellent sampler", adding: "The sequencing pays no attention to chronology, [but] despite this, Scott's impassioned singing holds things together better than might be expected, and the effect is not unlike a good Waterboys concert." The 2000 book The Mojo Collection: The Ultimate Music Companion described the album as a "useful compilation" which "also rounds up some of Scott's stripped-down solo work".

Track listing

References

1998 compilation albums
The Waterboys albums